Niels Skousen (born January 28, 1944 in Cologne, Germany) is a Danish composer, guitarist, actor and poet. Niels Skousen is married to Linda Wendel (since 2003).

He started his musical career in 1964. After having heard the Bob Dylan album Another Side Of Bob Dylan, he started writing songs and learning to play guitar. His inspiration from Bob Dylan has lasted throughout his career.
He started on medical school, but left it to pursue a career as musician and actor. Niels Skousen made his record debut in 1971 with Herfra hvor vi står (Lyrics and music).

Theaters 
Studenterscenen
Secret Service, writer
Solvognen, writer and actor
Skousens Rockteater
Mammutteateret

Bands 

Young Flowers
Pan, singer
Skousen & Ingemann
Niels Skousen og band, Gert Smedegård, drums, Lennart Ginman, bass, Jonas Struck, guitar, Rune Kjeldsen, guitar and Niels Skousen, vocals and various instruments – February 2007.

Discografi 

Solo Records:
Jeg vender mig i sengen, 1973
Palads af glas, 1976
Landet rundt, 1980
Dobbeltsyn, 2002
Daddy Longleg, 2006
Lyt Til Din Coach, 2010
Smil eller dø, 2014

With others:
Skousen & Ingemann: Herfra hvor vi står, 1971;
Skousen & Ingemann: Musikpatruljen, 1972;
Skousen, Ingemann & Møller: Lykkehjulet, 1976;
Solvognen, Elverhøj, Fandens sang, 1976
Skousen & Ingemann: Forbryderalbum, 1978;
Natlægen (Niels Skousen, Troels Trier, Erik Clausen and others), 1979
Diverse kunstnere: På danske læber, Miraklet, 2004
Diverse kunstnere: Andersens Drømme, Tåbelige menneske (lyrics by Lars Frost, music by Nikolaj Nørlund), Brand (lyrics by Jørgen Leth, music by Nikolaj Nørlund), 2005

External links

Danskefilm profile

1944 births
Danish guitarists
Danish male actors
Living people